The masque was a form of festive courtly entertainment that flourished in 16th- and early 17th-century Europe, though it was developed earlier in Italy, in forms including the intermedio (a public version of the masque was the pageant). A masque involved music, dancing, singing and acting, within an elaborate stage design, in which the architectural framing and costumes might be designed by a renowned architect, to present a deferential allegory flattering to the patron. Professional actors and musicians were hired for the speaking and singing parts. Masquers who did not speak or sing were often courtiers: the English queen Anne of Denmark frequently danced with her ladies in masques between 1603 and 1611, and Henry VIII and Charles I of England performed in the masques at their courts. In the tradition of masque, Louis XIV of France danced in ballets at Versailles with music by Jean-Baptiste Lully.

Development
The masque tradition developed from the elaborate pageants and courtly shows of ducal Burgundy in the late Middle Ages. Masques were typically a complimentary offering to the prince among his guests and might combine pastoral settings, mythological fable, and the dramatic elements of ethical debate. There would invariably be some political and social application of the allegory. Such pageants often celebrated a birth, marriage, change of ruler or a Royal Entry and invariably ended with a tableau of bliss and concord.

Masque imagery tended to be drawn from Classical rather than Christian sources, and the artifice was part of the Grand dance. Masque thus lent itself to Mannerist treatment in the hands of master designers like Giulio Romano or Inigo Jones.

The New Historians, in works like the essays of Bevington and Holbrook's The Politics of the Stuart Court Masque (1998), have pointed out the political subtext of masques. At times, the political subtext was not far to seek: The Triumph of Peace, put on with a large amount of parliament-raised money by Charles I, caused great offence to the Puritans. Catherine de' Medici's court festivals, often even more overtly political, were among the most spectacular entertainments of her day, although the "intermezzi" of the Medici court in Florence could rival them.

Dumbshow
In English theatre tradition, a dumbshow is a masque-like interlude of silent mime usually with allegorical content that refers to the occasion of a play or its theme, the most famous being the dumbshow played out in Hamlet (III.ii). Dumbshows might be a moving spectacle, like a procession, as in Thomas Kyd's The Spanish Tragedy (1580s), or they might form a pictorial tableau, as one in the Shakespeare collaboration, Pericles, Prince of Tyre  (III.i)—a tableau that is immediately explicated at some length by the poet-narrator, Gower.

Dumbshows were a Medieval element that continued to be popular in early Elizabethan drama, but by the time Pericles (c. 1607–08) or  Hamlet  (c. 1600–02) were staged, they were perhaps quaintly old-fashioned: “What means this, my lord?” is Ophelia's reaction. In English masques, purely musical interludes might be accompanied by a dumbshow.

Origins
The masque has its origins in a folk tradition where masked players would unexpectedly call on a nobleman in his hall, dancing and bringing gifts on certain nights of the year, or celebrating dynastic occasions. The rustic presentation of "Pyramus and Thisbe" as a wedding entertainment in Shakespeare's A Midsummer Night's Dream offers a familiar example. Spectators were invited to join in the dancing. At the end, the players would take off their masks to reveal their identities.

England
In England, Tudor court masques developed from earlier guisings, where a masked allegorical figure would appear and address the assembled company—providing a theme for the occasion—with musical accompaniment. Costumes were designed by professionals, including Niccolo da Modena. Masques at Elizabeth's court emphasized the concord and unity between Queen and Kingdom. A descriptive narrative of a processional masque is the masque of the Seven Deadly Sins in Edmund Spenser's The Faerie Queene (Book i, Canto IV). A particularly elaborate masque, performed over the course of two weeks for Queen Elizabeth, is described in the 1821 novel Kenilworth, by Sir Walter Scott. Queen Elizabeth was entertained at country houses during her progresses with performances like the Harefield Entertainment.

In Scotland, masques were performed at court, particularly at wedding celebrations, and the royal wardrobe provided costumes. After the Union of the Crowns, at the court of James I and Anne of Denmark, narrative elements of the masque became more significant. Plots were often on classical or allegorical themes, glorifying the royal or noble sponsor. At the end, the audience would join with the actors in a final dance. Ben Jonson wrote a number of masques with stage design by Inigo Jones. Their works are usually thought of as the most significant in the form. Samuel Daniel and Sir Philip Sidney also wrote masques.

William Shakespeare included a masque-like interlude in The Tempest, understood by modern scholars to have been heavily influenced by the masques of Ben Jonson and the stagecraft of Inigo Jones. There is also a masque sequence in his Romeo and Juliet and Henry VIII. John Milton's Comus (with music by Henry Lawes) is described as a masque, though it is generally reckoned a pastoral play.

There is a detailed, humorous, and malicious (and possibly completely fictitious) account by Sir John Harington in 1606 of a masque of Solomon and Sheba at Theobalds. Harington was not so much concerned with the masque itself as with the notoriously heavy drinking at the Court of King James I; "the entertainment went forward, and most of the presenters went backward, or fell down, wine did so occupy their upper chambers".  As far as we can ascertain the details of the masque, the Queen of Sheba was to bring gifts to the King, representing Solomon, and was to be followed by the spirits of Faith, Hope, Charity, Victory and Peace. Unfortunately, as Harington reported, the actress playing the Queen tripped over the steps of the throne, sending her gifts flying; Hope and Faith were too drunk to speak a word, while Peace, annoyed at finding her way to the throne blocked, made good use of her symbolic olive branches to slap anyone who was in her way.

James Hay, 1st Earl of Carlisle, was a performer and sponsor of court masques. He wrote about the tight-fitting costumes, that it was the fashion "to appear very small in the waist, I remember was drawn up from the ground by both hands whilst the tailor with all his strength buttoned on my doublet". Reconstructions of Stuart masques have been few and far between. Part of the problem is that only texts survive complete; there is no complete music, only fragments, so no authoritative performance can be made without interpretive invention.

By the time of the English Restoration (1660), the masque was passé, but the English semi-opera which developed in the latter part of the 17th century, a form in which John Dryden and Henry Purcell collaborated, borrows some elements from the masque and further elements from the contemporary courtly French opera of Jean-Baptiste Lully.

In the 18th-century, masques were even less frequently staged. "Rule, Britannia!" started out as part of Alfred, a masque about Alfred the Great co-written by James Thomson and David Mallet with music by Thomas Arne which was first performed at Cliveden, country house of Frederick, Prince of Wales. Performed to celebrate the third birthday of Frederick's daughter Augusta, it remains among the best-known British patriotic songs up to the present, while the masque of which it was originally part is only remembered by specialist historians.

Legacy
The most outstanding humanists, poets and artists of the day, in the full intensity of their creative powers, devoted themselves to producing masques; and until the Puritans closed the English theatres in 1642, the masque was the highest art form in England. But because of its ephemeral nature, not a lot of documentation related to masques remains, and much of what is said about the production and enjoyment of masques is still part speculation.

17th- and 18th-century masques
While the masque was no longer as popular as it was at its height in the 17th century, there are many later examples of the masque. During the late 17th century, English semi-operas by composers such as Henry Purcell had masque scenes inset between the acts of the play proper. In the 18th century, William Boyce and Thomas Arne, continued to utilize the masque genre mostly as an occasional piece, and the genre became increasingly associated with patriotic topics. Acis and Galatea (Handel) is another successful example. There are isolated examples throughout the first half of the 19th century.

Later masques
With the renaissance of English musical composition during the late 19th and early 20th century (the so-called English Musical Renaissance), English composers turned to the masque as a way of connecting to a genuinely English musical-dramatic form in their attempts to build a historically informed national musical style for England. Examples include those by Arthur Sullivan, George Macfarren, and even Edward Elgar, whose imperialistic Crown of India was the central feature at the London Coliseum in 2005. Masques also became common as scenes in operettas and musical theatre works set during the Elizabethan period.

In the 20th century, Ralph Vaughan Williams wrote several masques, including his masterpiece in the genre, Job, a masque for dancing which premiered in 1930, although the work is closer to a ballet than a masque as it was originally understood. His designating it a masque was to indicate that the modern choreography typical when he wrote the piece would not be suitable.

Constant Lambert also wrote a piece he called a masque, Summer's Last Will and Testament, for orchestra, chorus and baritone. His title he took from Thomas Nash, whose masque was probably first presented before the Archbishop of Canterbury, perhaps at his London seat, Lambeth Palace, in 1592.

List of notable masques

17th-century masques

 Chloridia
 Christmas, His Masque
 Comus (John Milton)
 Cupid and Death
 The Fairy-Queen
 The Fortunate Isles and Their Union
 The Golden Age Restored
 The Gypsies Metamorphosed
 The Hue and Cry After Cupid
 Hymenaei
 The Lady of May
 Lord Hay's Masque
 The Lords' Masque
 The King's Entertainment at Welbeck
 London's Love to Prince Henry
 Love Freed from Ignorance and Folly
 Love Restored
 Love's Triumph Through Callipolis
 Love's Welcome at Bolsover
 Luminalia
 Mercury Vindicated from the Alchemists
 Neptune's Triumph for the Return of Albion
 Oberon, the Faery Prince
 Pleasure Reconciled to Virtue
 Salmacida Spolia
 Tempe Restored
 Tethys' Festival
 The Masque of Augurs
 The Masque of Beauty
 The Masque of Blackness
 The Masque of the Inner Temple and Gray's Inn
 The Masque of Queens
 The Memorable Masque of the Middle Temple and Lincoln's Inn
 The Shepherd's Paradise
 The Sun's Darling
 The Triumph of Beauty
 The Triumph of Peace
 The Vision of Delight
 The Vision of the Twelve Goddesses
 The World Tossed at Tennis
 Time Vindicated to Himself and to His Honours

18th-century masques

 Albion; or, The Court of Neptune
 Albion Restor'd
 Alfred
 Apollo and Daphne
 Beauty and Virtue
 Britannia
 Britannia and Batavia
 Calypso; a masque
 The Comick Masque of Pyramus and Thisbe
 Comus
 The Death of Dido
 The Druids, a masque
 The Fairy Favour
 The Fairy Festival
 The Fairy Prince
 The Festival
 The Genius of Ireland version 1
 The Genius of Ireland version 2
 The Happy Nuptials
 The Judgement of Hercules
 The Judgement of Paris
 Love and Glory
 The Masque of Hymen
 The Masque of Neptune's Prophecy
 The Masque of Orpheus and Euridice
 The Masque of Solon
 The Nuptials
 The Nuptial Masque
 Pan and Syrinx
 Peleus and Thetis: A Masque
 Presumptuous Love: A Dramatick Masque
 Shakespeare's Jubilee, a Masque
 The Statute, a Pastoral Masque
 The Syrens, a masque
 The Triumph of Peace
 Telemachus
 The Triumphs of Hibernia
 Venus and Adonis

Notes

References

Burden, Michael (1994), Garrick, Arne, and the Masque of Alfred, Edwin Mellon Press.
 
 Hart, Vaughan (1994). Art and Magic in the Court of the Stuarts. London, Routledge.
Ravelhofer, Barbara, (2006), The Early Stuart Masque: Dance, Costume, and Music, Oxford University Press.
Sabol, Andrew J. (editor), (1959), Songs and dances from the Stuart Masque. An edition of sixty-three items of music for the English court masque from 1604 to 1641, Brown University Press.
Sabol, Andrew J. (editor), (1982), Four hundred songs and dances from the Stuart Masque, Brown University Press.

External links

"The Elizabethan origins of the masque"
Cambridge History of English and American Literature: Popularity of the Masque in the age of Elizabeth
Cambridge History of English and American Literature: The Masque in Spenser
Florimène, 1635: the next-to-last masque of the court of Charles I
Masque of Anarchy, A Poem by Percy Bysshe Shelley

 
Theatrical genres
Concert dance
Renaissance dance
Opera terminology
European court festivities
Masks in Europe
Masks in theatre